The number of seats won by each party in the Australian House of Representatives at the 2022 federal election were: Coalition 58, Labor 77, Australian Greens 4, Centre Alliance 1, Katter's Australian Party 1, and Independents 10.

This election was held using instant-runoff voting. In almost all the districts, the candidate who lead in the first count was elected. Overall, only in 13 districts did a candidate who did not lead in the first count succeed in taking a seat in the end.

Australia

Maps

States

New South Wales

Victoria

Queensland

Western Australia

South Australia

Tasmania

Territories

Australian Capital Territory

Northern Territory

Metropolitan

Non-metropolitan

Two party preferred preference flow

Analysis 
The vast majority of electorates outside Tasmania swung to Labor. This is especially true for inner-city seats. The vast majority of inner-city seats held by the Liberal Party were won by either Labor, teal independents or the Greens.

Despite losing the two-party preferred vote both nationally and in every state except Queensland, the Coalition won the first preference vote nationally and in every state except Western Australia and the two territories. Nevertheless, both major parties had swings against them nationally and in every state except Queensland, Western Australia and the Australian Capital Territory. Tasmania was the only state that swung to the Coalition on a two-party preferred vote. Outside Tasmania, the Coalition's vote dropped more than Labor's.

The Coalition's losses in seats were limited to the Liberal Party, as the National Party retained all of its seats, despite both Coalition parties having swings against them in the vast majority of seats.

On a two-party preferred basis, few electorates swung to the Coalition outside Victoria and Tasmania. These were the electorates of Calare, Fowler, Gilmore, Lindsay, Page, Parkes, Paterson and Whitlam in New South Wales; Herbert and Kennedy in Queensland; and Lingiari in the Northern Territory.

Notes

References 

2022 Australian federal election
House of Representatives 2022